Greg DePaul is an American playwright and screenwriter, best known for the romantic comedy Bride Wars.

Biography
DePaul grew up in Maryland and graduated from NYU. After college, he worked as a private investigator and wrote for The Washington Post. In 1998, DePaul moved to Los Angeles, where he directed his own play, Motherlove. DePaul teamed with writer Hank Nelken to create a comic short film, Jerry Mashugana, a parody of the hit comedy Jerry Maguire, which starred Matt Damon, Geoffrey Rush and Demi Moore.

Career
Saving Silverman, starring Jack Black and Jason Biggs, which was released by Sony Pictures in 2001. The film falls within a cross-genre film type from the late 1990s and early 2000s in which grooms are saved, or nearly saved, from distasteful marriage. It opened at No. 3 at the North American box office making $7.4 million USD in its opening weekend. The film grossed a domestic total of $19,402,030 and $26,086,706 worldwide from a $22 million budget. Killer Bud, was produced independently. It was Robert Stack's final film prior to his death in 2003.

He then wrote Bride Wars, starring Kate Hudson, Anne Hathaway and Candace Bergen. DePaul got the idea when he and his wife were planning a double wedding with her sister. In its opening weekend, the film grossed $21,058,173 ranking #2 at the box office. A Chinese remake of the same name was released in 2015.

DePaul's plays and sketch comedy have been performed by  The Collective NY, a theatre company in Manhattan. He has performed improv comedy and co-founded Cornfed. DePaul has served on the Board of the Writers and Actors Lab, and co-founded The Clark Street Players. He wrote the comedy screenwriting manual, Bring the Funny: The Essential Companion for the Comedy Screenwriter. He also led a screenwriting workshop for Harvardwood, a group of Harvard alumni in the entertainment industry, and taught Screenwriting at NYU.

References

External links
Greg DePaul's Official Website

Year of birth missing (living people)
Living people
American dramatists and playwrights
American educators
American male screenwriters
Writers of books about writing fiction
Screenwriting instructors